Frank Testaverde Scioscia (October 27, 1935 – December 26, 2018) was an American film and television actor. He was perhaps best known for playing the mobster Anthony Stabile in the 1990 film Goodfellas.

Life and career 
Adonis was born in Brooklyn, New York. His first film role was in 1971 in The French Connection, where he played the uncredited role of a bidder at a car auction in New York. During the 1970s Adonis appeared in films such as Shaft's Big Score!, Cops and Robbers, Lucky Luciano, Crazy Joe, The Gambler and The Gang That Couldn't Shoot Straight. In 1978, he co-starred in the film Eyes of Laura Mars, in which he played the role of Detective Sal Volpe.

In 1980 Adonis co-starred in the film Raging Bull, where he played the role of Patsy. He appeared in further films including Goodfellas, Spike of Bensonhurst, Wolfen, King of New York, Ace Ventura: Pet Detective, Find Me Guilty, The Trouble with Cali, True Romance, Casino, Ghost Dog: The Way of the Samurai, The Juror and Wall Street. In 2002, Adonis played the lead role of a bereaved Mafia gangster in the film High Times' Potluck. He directed the film One Deadly Road, and wrote for the 2007 film The Woods Have Eyes.

His television credits include The Equalizer (4 episodes), The Sopranos, Law & Order: Criminal Intent and New York Undercover. His last credit was in the 2017 film Proximity to Power.

Death 
Adonis died in December 2018, after a long battle from complications of kidney disease in Las Vegas, Nevada, at the age of 83.

Filmography

Film

Television

References

External links 

Rotten Tomatoes profile

1935 births
2018 deaths
People from Brooklyn
Male actors from New York (state)
American male film actors
American male television actors
20th-century American male actors
21st-century American male actors
Deaths from kidney failure
American people of Italian descent